2nd Street is the second studio album by the English rock band Back Street Crawler and was released on the Atco Records label. It was released after Paul Kossoff's death in March 1976, and is dedicated to him. The album is regarded as a considerable advance on their 1975 debut The Band Plays On, but Kossoff's involvement in it is limited to lead guitar lines over the completed tracks.

Track listing

Personnel
Back Street Crawler
Terry Wilson Slesser – lead vocals
Paul Kossoff – lead guitar
Terry Wilson – bass, acoustic and electric guitars
John "Rabbit" Bundrick – keyboard, vocals
Tony Braunagel – drums, vocals
with:
W.G. 'Snuffy' Walden [uncredited] - guitar
Technical
Richard Digby Smith - engineer
Glyn Johns - mixing
Abie Sussman, Bob Defrin - art direction
Sam Emerson - photography

References

 Back Street Crawler. 2nd Street album cover

1976 albums
Atco Records albums
Back Street Crawler (band) albums